New Country Rehab is a Canadian alternative country band. Based in Toronto, Ontario, the band consists of John Showman on vocals and fiddle, Anthony Da Costa on guitar, Ben Whiteley on bass and Roman Tomé on drums. All four members are established session musicians in the Toronto area, who have played in supporting bands for artists such as Basia Bulat, Justin Rutledge and Amy Millan.

History
New Country Rehab formed in 2007, and began performing music based on the songs of Hank Williams. They played in Toronto clubs, adapting familiar country and popular tunes with their own sound, a mix of country, pop, folk and roots.

The band released its self-titled debut album on January 11, 2011, featuring songs written by Showman and Robertson along with some cover tunes.

The band later signed with Kelp Records, and released their second album, Ghost of Your Charms, in March, 2013.  The album contains some elements of pop and folk, and is a mixture of original material and cover tunes. They toured in Ontario and western Canada in support of the album, and in 2014 toured in the United States.

In 2015 the band received a grant from the Ontario Music Fund.

Discography
New Country Rehab (2011)
Ghost of Your Charms (2013)

References

External links
New Country Rehab official website

Musical groups established in 2010
Musical groups from Toronto
Canadian alternative country groups
2010 establishments in Ontario